The following is a list of motorcycle manufacturers worldwide, sorted by extant/extinct status and by country. These are producers whose motorcycles are available to the public, including both street legal as well as racetrack-only or off-road-only motorcycles. The list of current manufacturers does not include badge engineered bikes or motorcycle customisers, but the list of defunct manufactures may include some of these if they are well remembered for their historical significance.

Argentina 
Motomel 
Zanella

Australia 
Hunter Motorcycles 
Thumpstar

Austria  
Husqvarna
KTM
Ksr
Rotax

Bangladesh 
Akij Motors 
Jamuna Automobiles
Niloy-Hero Motors — (joint venture between Niloy Group and Hero MotoCorp of India)
Runner Automobiles
Walton Motors

Belarus  
MMZ

Brazil 
Dafra Motos

Canada 
Bombardier/Can-Am - (trikes)

China  
Chang Jiang
Dayun
Evoke Motorcycles
Jincheng Suzuki
Keeway
Lifan
Loncin
Niu Technologies
Qianjiang
Qingqi
Yinxiang Motorcycle
Znen 
Zongshen
 Egl
Nicot
Kamax

Colombia 
AKT
Auteco

Czech Republic 
Čezeta
Jawa Moto

France 
Midual
Peugeot Scooters
Scorpa
Sherco
Solex
Voxan

Germany 
BMW Motorrad
DKW
Horex
Hercules
Kreidler
Maico
Megola
MZ Motorrad- und Zweiradwerk
NSU
Sachs Motorcycles
Simson
Zündapp

India 
Bold refers as premium Bikes.
Ather Energy
Bajaj Auto
KTM
Husqvarna
Hero Motocorp 
Mahindra Two Wheelers
BSA motorcycles
Yezdi
Jawa Moto
Ola Electric
Royal Enfield
TVS Motors
Norton
Ultraviolette Automotive

Italy 

Adiva
Aprilia
Askoll
Beta Motor
Benelli — (now owned by Qianjiang of China)
Bimota
Cagiva — (inactive under MV Agusta)
Ducati
Energica
Fantic Motor
Ghezzi & Brian
Gilera
Innocenti 
Italjet
Lambretta
Laverda
Magni
Malaguti
FB Mondial
Moto Guzzi
Moto Morini - (now owned by Znen Group of China)
MV Agusta
Paton
Piaggio
SWM
Terra Modena
Vespa
Vyrus

Japan 
Honda
Kawasaki
Suzuki
Yamaha
Moriwaki — (merged with Honda)

South Korea 
Daelim
Hyosung
KR Motors

Malaysia 
Modenas
Naza
SYM Motors

Mexico 
Italika

Pakistan 
DYL Motorcycles — (joint venture between Dawood Hercules and Yamaha Motor of Japan)
Ravi Motorcycles — (also partner with Piaggio Group of Italy)
United Motorcycles

Poland 
Junak
SFM Junak
Zipp

Portugal 
 AJP
 Casal

Russia 
IMZ-Ural
IZh
Velomotors
ZiD as the Voskhod

Slovenia 
Tomos

Spain 
Bultaco
Derbi
Gas Gas
Montesa
Ossa
Rieju
Sanglas

Taiwan 
 Aeon Motor
 Gogoro
 Kymco
 PGO
 SYM
 Taiwan Golden Bee

Thailand 
Dayang Motors — (joint venture between Charoen Pokphand & Dayun Group of China)

Turkey 
 Mondial (Ugur Motor Vehicles)

Ukraine 
KMZ

United Kingdom 

Ariel Motor Company
Brough Superior
Cheney Racing
Clews Competition Motorcycles
Hesketh
Métisse
Norton
Scomadi
Triumph
Wasp Motorcycles

United States 
Bold refers as Premium Bike 
Italic refers as EV Bike

Alligator
Arch Motorcycle
Boss Hoss
Brammo
Cleveland CycleWerks
Confederate/Curtiss Motorcycles
Erik Buell Racing
Harley-Davidson
Indian Motorcycle
Janus Motorcycles
Lightning Motorcycle
MTT
Rokon
US Highland
Z Electric Vehicle
Zero Motorcycles

Drr 
Buell

Vietnam 

 VinFast

Manufacturers no longer in production
This is a list of companies that formerly produced and sold motorcycles available to the public, including both street and race/off-road motorcycles. It also includes some former motorcycle producers of noted historical significance but which would today be classified as badge engineered or customisers. It includes both companies that are defunct, those that still exist but no longer make motorcycles, and some that were acquired by other companies.

Argentina
Siambretta
Tehuelche
Puma

Australia
Abbotsford motorcycles (1912–1913)
Absolom motorcycles (1915–)
Aussi Also (1920–)
Bennett & Barkell Motorcycles (1910 to at least 1917)
Waratah motorcycles (1911 to around 1948)

Austria
Delta-Gnom (1923–1963)
Laurin & Klement (1899–1908)
Puch (1903–1987)

Belgium
FN (1901–1967)
Gillet Herstal 
Minerva (1900–1914)
Saroléa (1901–1960)

Brazil
Agrale (1984–1987)
Brumana Pugliese (1970–1982)

Bulgaria
Balkan (1958–1975)

Canada
 Can-Am (1973–1987, brand reused 2006–present for ATVs and trikes)
 Moto-Skeeter (mini-bikes, 1971–1972)

Czech Republic
Böhmerland (1923–1939)
CZ (1935–1997)
ESO (1949–1962)
Jawa CZ 
Praga Hostivař (1929–1933)
Premier (1913–1933)

Denmark
Nimbus (1919–1959)

Estonia
Renard (1938-1944)

Finland
Helkama
Tunturi

France

AGF
Aiglon (1908–1953)
Alcyon (1904–1957)
Automoto
Dollar (1925–1939)
Dresch (1923–1939)
Gima
Gnome et Rhône (1919–1959)
Juery (1930s–1960s)
Monet-Goyon
Motobécane
New-Map
Nougier 
Radior 
Ratier (1959–1962)
Scorpa (1993–2009)
Terrot

Germany

Adler (1900–1957)
Ardie (1919–1957)
D-Rad (1923–1933)
DKW (1916–66)
Express (1933–1958)
Hansen & Schneider (1975-1982)
Hecker (1922–1957)
Hercules (1904–1996)
Hildebrand & Wolfmüller (1894–1897)
Hoffman (1949–1954)
Horex (1923–1960)
Killinger and Freund Motorcycle (1935)
Kreidler (1951–1982)
Maico (1926–1986)
Mars (1903–1958)
Megola (1921–1925)
Münch (1966–1980)
Neander (1924–1932)
NSU (1901–1960)
Opel (1901–1930)
Orionette (1921–1925)
Simson (1948–1963)
TWN (Triumph Nürnberg) (1903–1957)
Victoria (1899–1966)
Wanderer (1902–1929)
Windhoff (not anymore)
Zündapp (1921–1984)

East Germany
BMW (1945–1952)
EMW (1952–)
MZ (−2009)

Greece
Alta (1962–1972)
Lefas (1982–2005)
Maratos (1950)
MEBEA (1960–1975)
Mego (1962–1992)

Hungary
Csepel (1932–1951, Pannonia 1951–1975)

India

Andhra Pradesh Scooters Ltd (Allwyn Pushpak)
API (Lamby scooters)
Escorts Group (WFM/Yamaha motorcycles)
Ideal Jawa (1960–1996) 
Kinetic Engineering (Luna/Honda NH scooters)
Lambretta licensed manufacturers
LML (Vespa scooters)
Mopeds India Limited (Suvega-Motobecane mopeds)

Italy

Abra
Accossato
Aermacchi
Aeromere/Capriolo 
Aetos
Agrati
AIM
Alano
Alato
Aldbert
Atala
Autozodiaco
Benelli (Sold to Qianjiang Motorcycle (China))
Bianchi (1897–1967)
Caproni
Ceccato (1947–1962)
Cimatti
CNA
Della Ferrera
Frera
Fusi
Galbusera
Garelli Motorcycles (1919–2012)
Gilera
Italjet
Innocenti (1947–1997)
Iso Rivolta (1953–1974)
Lamborghini (1986)
Lambretta
Laverda (1949–2006)
Malaguti (1930-2018)
Malanca (1956–1986)
MAS
Maserati (1947–1960)
Morbidelli
Moretti Motor Company
Moto Rumi
Motobi
Santamaria (1951–1963)

Japan

Abe-Star (1951–1958)
Aero (1925–1927)
Bridgestone (1952–1970)
Fuji 
Hodaka (1964–1980)
Marusho (1948–1967)
Meguro (1937–1964)
Mitsubishi (1946–1963)
Miyata
Rikuo (1929–1958)
Shin Meiwa (1952–1964)
Tohatsu (1950–1964)
Yamaguchi (1955–1963)

Mexico
Cooper (1971–1975)

New Zealand
Britten Motorcycles 
Nzeta
Wood

Norway
Tempo

Poland

CWS
SHL
SM
Sokół 
WFM
WSK
Zuch

Portugal
CASAL (1953–2000)
FAMEL (1950–2002)
SIS

Russian Empire
Alexander Leutner & Co. (1899–1918?)

Slovak Republic
Babetta (1970–1997)

Spain

Alpha (1924-1957)
Avello (1940-2013)
Bultaco (1958–1983)
Cofersa (1954–1962)
Gimson (1930–1982)
Lube (1947–1967)
Montesa (1945–1985)
MotoTrans (1957–1983)
Ossa (1924–1982; 2010– )
Sanglas (1942–1981)

Sweden

Aktiv (1927–1937)
Husaberg (1988–2014)
Husqvarna (Transfer to KTM Austria)
Monark 
Nordstjernan

Switzerland
Motosacoche (1900–1956)

United Kingdom

Ackland Motorcycles Co (1895-1936)
Acme Motor Co (1902-1922)
AJS 
AJW (1928–1977)
Allen Norton (1990-1994)
Ambassador (1946–1964)
AMC (1938–1966)
Ariel (1902–1970)
Armstrong (1980–1987)
Beardmore Precision (1921–1924)
Blackburne (1913–1921)
Brough (1908–1926)
Brough Superior³ (1919–1940)
BSA (1905–2003); see BSA Company 
Calthorpe 
Clyno (1908–1923)
Cotton 
Coventry-Eagle 
DOT 
Douglas (1907–1957)
EMC (1946–1977)
Excelsior (Coventry) (1896–1962)
Francis-Barnett (1919–1966) 
Greeves
Haden
Hesketh (1982–1984)
HRD
Ivy (1907–1934)
James (1987–1966)
JAP (1902–1964)
Levis (1911–1939)
Martinsyde (1908–1923)
Matchless (1899–1966)
Megelli (2004-2014)
Ner-a Car (1921–1926)
New Hudson 
New Imperial (1901–1939)
Norman 
Norton-Villiers (1966-1972)
Norton (1902–; reformed in 2008)
OEC (1901–1954)
OK-Supreme (1882–1940)
Panther 
Quadrant (1901–1928)
Quasar (1977–1985)
Raleigh (1899–1967)
Rickman (1960–1975)
Royal Enfield (1901–1968); company was taken over by India's Eicher Motors)
Rudge (1909–1939)
Scott (1909–1978)
Singer 
Sprite
Stevens (1934–1938)
Sun (1911–1961)
Sunbeam (1912–1956)
Tandon
Triumph Engineering Ltd (1902–; reformed in the 1980s and now still made)
Velocette (1904–1968)
Villiers 
Vincent
Vincent HRD (1928– )
Wooler (1911–1954)
Zenith (1903–1950)

United States

Ace (1920–1927)
American IronHorse (1995–2008)
Buell (2009–2015)
Buell Motorcycle Company (1983–2009)
California Motorcycle Company (?–1999)
Crocker (1932–1941)
Curtiss (1902–1910) Reformed in 2017
Cushman (1936–1965)
Excelsior (Chicago) (1907–1931)
Excelsior-Henderson (1993 / 1998–2001)
Fischer
Flying Merkel (1911–1915)
Henderson (1911–1931)
Hodaka (1965–1978)
Indian 
original Springfield company (1901–1953)
Gilroy company (1999–2003)
Stellican Limited (2006–2011)
Iver Johnson (1907–1916)
MotoCzysz 
Mustang (1945–1963)
Ner-A-Car (1921–1927)
Penton (1968–1978)
Pierce-Arrow (1909–1913)
Pope Manufacturing Company (1902–1918)
Ridley
Roehr Motorcycles
Sears, Roebuck and Company (1912–1916)
Simplex (1935–1960)
Thor (1908–1920)
Titan
Victory Motorcycles (1997–2017)
Wagner Motorcycle Company (1901–1914)
Yankee

USSR
Cossack 
GMZ (1941–1949)
MMZ (1941, 1946–1951)
NATI (1931–1933)
PMZ (1935–1939)
TIZ (1936–1941)
TMZ (1941–1943)

See also
List of motor scooter manufacturers and brands

References

Lists of manufacturers